An impurity is a substance inside a confined amount of liquid, gas, or solid, which differs from the chemical composition of the material or compound.

Impurity may also refer to:

 Impurity (Fleshcrawl album), 1994
 Impurity (New Model Army album), 1990
 Gini impurity, in decision tree learning

See also
 Purity
 Ritual impurity
 Aśuddhatā, in Hindu religion
 Dirty
 Unclean (disambiguation)
 Vice